La mia risposta (English: "My Answer") is Italian singer Laura Pausini's fifth studio album, issued by CGD East West (Warner) Records in 1998. Mi respuesta is its Spanish language edition for the hispanophone market.

Between February and April 1999, the La mia risposta World Tour was held to support and promote the album in Europe.
The album was not as successful as her previous one, Le cose che vivi. As of September 2000, it has sold around 2 million copies worldwide. The singles taken from the album were "Una Emergenza D'Amore / Emergencia de Amor", "In Asenzza Di Te / En Ausencia de Ti" and "La Mia Risposta / Mi Respuesta", placing themselves in the first places of popularity in Italy, Europe and Latin America. And "Che Bene Mi Fai/ Me Siento Tan Bien" only was a promotional single to Spain.

Track listing

La mia risposta

Mi respuesta

Charts and certifications

Charts

Certifications

References 

1998 albums
Laura Pausini albums
Spanish-language albums